The Link and the Chain is a 1963 French documentary film about life in the Loyalty Islands, directed by Jacques Ertaud. It was nominated for an Academy Award for Best Documentary Feature. The film was preserved by the Academy Film Archive in 2015.

References

External links

Le Maillon et la chaîne at UniFrance

1963 films
1963 documentary films
1960s French-language films
French documentary films
Films directed by Jacques Ertaud
Loyalty Islands
1960s French films